Uploders is a small village in Dorset, England. It consists mainly of houses, and has a pub, the Crown, a Grade II listed Methodist chapel  and a playing field. The River Asker runs through the village. It is a linear village, surrounding the minor road between Bridport and Askerswell.

There are several places of interest to visit, such as the market town of Bridport, the harbour at West Bay, the beaches along the Jurassic Coast, Burton Bradstock and West Bay being the nearest, and the Iron Age hill fort of Eggardon Hill Which is about  To the east.

See also
 Loders

References

External links 

 Loders/Uploders information

Villages in Dorset